This is a complete list of banks in Croatia as of May 2022. Based on official lists from Croatian National Bank, responsible for bank supervision in Croatia.

Central bank
Croatian National Bank

Licensed banks
, there are 19 licensed banks in Croatia:

Licensed housing savings banks
, there are 2 licensed housing savings banks in Croatia:

Other licensed institutions with full authorization

Croatian Bank for Reconstruction and Development, www.hbor.hr

EU-based credit and financial institutions

List of EU-based credit and financial institutions that can directly provide mutually recognized services in the territory of the Republic of Croatia: Popis institucija koje ostvaruju slobodu poslovnog nastana i slobodu pružanja usluga

References

Croatia
Banks
Croatia